Monsters is a short 2004 horror film written and directed by Robert Morgan, which had the working title Broadmoor.

It won the 2004 Bacchus Award at the Boston Underground Film Festival.

External links
 
 Edinburgh Shorts: Monsters, BBC

2004 films
2004 horror films
British independent films
2000s British films